This article shows all participating team squads at the 2003 FINA Women's World Water Polo Championship, held in Barcelona, Catalonia, Spain from July 13 to July 25, 2003.

Jemma Brownlow
Melissa Byram
Nikita Cuffe
Naomi Castle
Joanne Fox
Kate Gynther
Emma Knox
Elise Norwood
Melissa Rippon
Rebecca Rippon
Jodie Stuhmcke
Bronwyn Smith
Taryn Woods
Head coach:
István Gorgenyi

Marina Canetti
Viviane Costa
Flávia Fernandes
Cláudia Graner
Andréa Henriques
Mayla Siracusa
Maria Marques
Tess Oliveira
Rubi Palmieri
Camila Pedrosa
Mariana Resstom
Mariana Roriz
Melina Teno
Head coach:
David Hart

Marie Luc Arpin
Christi Bardecki
Johanne Bégin
Cora Campbell
Melissa Collins
Andrea Dewar
Valérie Dionne
Ann Dow
Susan Gardiner
Marianne Illing
Rachel Kiddell
Whynter Lamarre
Jana Salat
Head coach:
Patrick Oaten

Myriam Argaud
Cécile Busteau
Gaelle De Rycke
Isabelle Fack
Laure Gauthreau
Alice Goulut
Louise Guillet
Vanessa Hernandez
Perrine Metay
Virginie Mozdzierz
Aurelia Picot
Jenny Ritz
Caroline Ruder
Head coach:
Jean-Luc Doucereux

Simone Budde
Barbara Bujka
Viktoria Bujka
Katrin Dierolf
Linda Gerrifsen
Laura Gruber
Theresa Klein
Sabine Kottig
Monika Kruszona
Imke Odenthal
Lina Rohe
Ariane Rump
Stefanie Schindelbauer
Head coach:
Marcel ter Bals

Bernice Cowton
Helen Dacre
Larissa Davies
Laura Evans
Karin Hales
Ruth Hawney
Frances Leighton
Kate Lewis
Carol Mohan
Tara Smith
Hannah Wild
Angela Winstanley
Siobhan Winter
Head coach:
Nick Hume

Stavroula Antonakou
Dimitra Asilian
Georgia Ellinaki
Maria Kanellopoulou
Stavroula Kozompoli
Georgia Lara
Kyriaki Liosi
Evangelia Moraitidou
Anthoula Mylonaki
Aikaterini Oikonomopoulou
Amalia Paterou
Sofia Petsali
Antigoni Roumpesi
Head coach:
Kyriakos Iosifidis

Anett Gyore
Rita Dravucz
Patricia Horvath
Dora Kisteleki
Aniko Pelle
Ágnes Primász
Kata Redei
Mercedes Stieber
Krisztina Szremko
Zsuzsanna Tiba
Agnes Valkay
Erzebet Valkay
Ildiko Zirighne
Head coach:
Tamás Faragó

Carmela Allucci
Alexandra Araujo
Silvia Bosurgi
Francesca Conti
Melania Greco
Erika Lava
Giusi Malato
Tania di Mario
Martina Miceli
Maddalena Musumeci
Cinzia Ragusa
Noémi Tóth
Manuela Zanchi
Head coach:
Pierluigi Formiconi

Momoko Arai
Tomoka Gyoten
Akiko Inagaki
Aya Kakoshi
Mari Kawasaki
Naoko Koiso
Mayu Mimaki
Miki Numazaki
Makoto Tanaka
Mika Yahagi
Akane Yamazaki
Mari Yasumi
Machi Yoshioka
Head coach:
Fumiaki Kimura

Natalya Galkina
Marina Gritsenko
Tatyana Gubina
Natalya Ignatyeva
Assel Jakayeva
Alyona Klimenko
Svetlana Koroleva
Natalya Krassilinikova
Natalya Kutuzova
Galina Rytova
Irina Tolkunova
Alexandra Zarkova
Anna Zubkova
Head coach:
Andrey Sazykin

Marleen Ars
Gillian van den Berg
Daniëlle de Bruin
Rianne Guichelaar
Hanneke Kappen
Simone Koot
Karin Kuipers
Meike de Nooy
Jorieke Oostendorp
Heleen Peerenboom
Tjarda Rodenhuis
Carla Quint
Mieke van der Sloot
Head coach:
Peter Paul Metz

Svetlana Bogdanova
Maria Yaina
Sofia Konoukh
Veronika Linkova
Tatiana Petrova
Ekaterina Salimova
Natalia Shepelina
Ekaterina Shishova
Elena Smurova
Olga Turova
Valentina Vorontsova
Galina Zlotnikova
Anastasia Zubkova
Head coach:
Yury Mitianin

Elisabeth Fuentes
Blanca Gil
Sara Dominguez
Cristina López
Anna Pardo
Jennifer Pareja
Anna Ramirez
Mariona Ribera
Belen Sanchez
Patricia del Soto
Cristina Ungo de Velasco
Merce Valles
Mireia Ventura
Head coach:
Gaspar Ventura

Robin Beauregard
Margaret Dingeldein
Gabrielle Domanic
Ellen Estes
Jacqueline Frank
Natalie Golda
Ericka Lorenz
Heather Moody
Thalia Munro
Nicolle Payne
Heather Petri
Amber Stachowski
Brenda Villa
Head coach:
Guy Baker

Almedia Aldana
Yesvia Alvarado
Gregory Aguilar
Yessenia Bastardo
Carol Caliz
Andreina Diaz
Rocio Galue
Fabiola Godoy
Serginel Maza
Selene Rego
Stephany Rivero
Thais Suarez
Xomar Vilar
Head coach:
Carlos Fernandez

References

SwimNews

Wom
World Aquatics Championships water polo squads
2003 in women's water polo